Peritoneal ligaments are folds of peritoneum that are used to connect viscera to viscera or the abdominal wall.

There are multiple named ligaments that usually are named in accordance with what they are.

 Gastrocolic ligament, connects the stomach and the colon.
 Splenocolic ligament, connects the spleen and the colon.
 Gastrosplenic ligament
 Gastrophrenic ligament
 Phrenicocolic ligament 
 Splenorenal ligament 
 Hepatic ligaments - Ligaments that are associated with the liver
 Coronary ligament 
 Left triangular ligament 
 Right triangular ligament  
 Hepatoduodenal ligament 
 Hepatogastric ligament
 Falciform ligament
 Round ligament of liver

References 

Abdomen